Tongren, known to Tibetans as Rebgong in the historic region of Amdo, is the capital and second smallest administrative subdivision by area within Huangnan Tibetan Autonomous Prefecture in Qinghai, China. The city has an area of 3465 square kilometers and a population of ~80,000 (2002), 75% Tibetan. The economy of the city includes agriculture and aluminium mining.

The city has a number of Tibetan Buddhist temples and gompas, including the large and significant Rongwo Monastery of the Gelug school. It is known as a center of thangka painting. Regong arts were named on the UNESCO Intangible Cultural Heritage Lists in 2009.

In October, 2010 there were reports of large demonstrations in Tongren by Tibetan students who reportedly shouted the slogans, “equality of ethnic groups” and “freedom of language."

Demographics and languages
The Amdo Tibetan is the lingua franca of Tongren and the surrounding region, which is populated by Tibetan and Hui people, as well as some Han Chinese and Mongols.

The Wutun language, a Chinese-Bonan-Tibetan mixed language, is spoken by some 2,000 people in the two villages of Upper and Lower Wutun, located on the eastern bank of the Rongwo River.

Climate
Tongren has a highland humid continental climate (Köppen Dwb)

See also
 List of administrative divisions of Qinghai

References

External links

A Century in Rebkong, Amdo, an Amdo primer
 Video about Tongren - the city of Tongren and its most important monasteries with famous Buddhist art schools for Thangka painting
 Travel Videos from mickspatz at www.spatz-darmstadt.de - travel videos about Buddhist Monasteries and Tibetan Art of the Tongren-Rebkong valley and Xiahe
Videos about a great festival in Tongren-Rebkong, July 2006 By Italian writer Mario Biondi, in Italian
Photographs of Tongren/Repkong Shaman Festival

County-level divisions of Qinghai
Amdo
Huangnan Tibetan Autonomous Prefecture
Cities in Qinghai